Boris Léontieff-Teahu (19 September 1955 — 23 May 2002), was a French Polynesian politician and member of the Assembly of French Polynesia. He was the mayor of Arue, a small commune on the Windward Islands, and founder and President of the Fetia Api party until his disappearance in 2002.

He was the brother of former President of French Polynesia, Alexandre Léontieff.

Political career

Boris Léontieff was born in Papeete, French Polynesia on 9 September 1955. He began his political career in 1989 as the Mayor of Arue, a small town on the outskirts of Papeete.

In 1996, Léontieff founded the Fetia Api party, which advocated for French Polynesian independence and opposed Gaston Flosse. Journalist Jean-Pascal Couraud, who blamed Gaston Flosse for the closure of his newspaper, also helped establish the party.

Léontieff ran for the Windward Islands seats at the 1996 French Polynesian legislative election. His party successfully won one seat, and he was elected to the Assembly. At the same election, his brother returned to politics and successfully represented a pro-independence party, sharing the beliefs of his brother Boris. Shortly after this, Couraud went missing on December 15th 1997, and Boris Léontieff temporarily left his position.

At the 2001 election Fetia Api won seven seats, and Léontieff was again elected to the Assembly.

Disappearance
On 23 May 2002, Léontieff and Fetia Api members Lucien Kimitete, Arsen Tuairau and Ferfine Besseyre set out on a flight from Kaukura to Makemo in the Tuamotus to campaign in municipal elections. The plane was diverted due to bad weather to Nuku Hiva in the Marquesas Islands, and failed to arrive in Makemo. A sea-search was unsuccessful, and was called off after a week. The French colonial government refused to delay the elections. Despite a number of private searches, the aircraft was never found, and Léontieff was declared dead in January 2003. A 2005 inquiry into the disappearance by the Fetia Api party concluded that the aircraft may have crashed due to a fuel supply problem.

In 2004, allegations that Jean-Pascal Couraud had been murdered by members of the Gaston Flosse's private police force, the Presidential Intervention Group (GIP), led to speculation that Léontieff's disappearance had been the result of foul play. Allegations were also made that both Léontieff and Courard had been under surveillance by the Flosse regime. The Assembly of French Polynesia began an inquiry in June 2005. In 2009 a letter was found admitting guilt to Couraud's kidnapping, and a French judge investigating the case expanded their investigation to include Léontieff's disappearance. The investigation found no explanation for the plane's disappearance, and the case was closed in May 2011. A claim for compensation by Léontieff's widow was rejected in March 2013.

References 

1955 births
2002 deaths
French Polynesian people of Russian descent
People from Papeete
Fetia Api politicians
Mayors of places in French Polynesia
Members of the Assembly of French Polynesia
Missing air passengers